Cyanotis (syn. Tonningia) is a genus of mainly perennial plants in the family Commelinaceae, first described in 1825. It is native to Africa, southern Asia, and northern Australia.

 Species
 Cyanotis adscendens Dalzell - India, Sri Lanka
 Cyanotis ake-assii Brenan - Mali, Ivory Coast
 Cyanotis angusta C.B.Clarke - West Africa
 Cyanotis arachnoidea C.B.Clarke - tropical Africa, Indian Subcontinent, southern China, Indochina
 Cyanotis arcotensis R.S.Rao - southern India
 Cyanotis axillaris (L.) D.Don ex Sweet - Indian Subcontinent, southern China, Southeast Asia, Northern Australia
 Cyanotis beddomei (Hook.f.) Erhardt, Götz & Seybold - southern India
 Cyanotis burmanniana Wight - India, Sri Lanka, Myanmar
 Cyanotis caespitosa Kotschy & Peyr. - tropical Africa
 Cyanotis cerifolia R.S.Rao & Kammathy - southern India
 Cyanotis ceylanica Hassk. - Sri Lanka
 Cyanotis cristata(L.) D.Don - Indian Subcontinent, southern China, Southeast Asia, Ethiopia, Socotra, Mauritius, Java, Philippines
 Cyanotis cucullata (Roth) Kunth - southern India, Myanmar, Thailand
 Cyanotis cupricola J.Duvign. - Zaïre
 Cyanotis dybowskii Hua - Congo-Brazzaville, Central African Republic
 Cyanotis fasciculata (B.Heyne ex Roth) Schult. & Schult.f.  - Indian Subcontinent
 Cyanotis flexuosa C.B.Clarke - Huíla region of Angola
 Cyanotis foecunda DC. ex Hassk - central + eastern Africa, Yemen
 Cyanotis ganganensis Schnell - Guinea
 Cyanotis grandidieri H.Perrier - Madagascar
 Cyanotis hepperi Brenan - Nigeria
 Cyanotis homblei De Wild. - Zaïre
 Cyanotis karliana Hassk. - southern India
 Cyanotis lanata Benth. - tropical + southern Africa, Yemen
 Cyanotis lapidosa Phil.  - South Africa, Eswatini
 Cyanotis longifolia Benth. - tropical Africa
 Cyanotis loureiroana (Schult. & Schult.f.) Merr - Guangdong, Hainan, Vietnam
 Cyanotis lourensis Schnell - Guinea
 Cyanotis nilagirica Hassk. - southern India
 Cyanotis nyctitropa Deflers - Yemen, Saudi Arabia
 Cyanotis obtusa (Trimen) Trimen - southern India, Sri Lanka
 Cyanotis pachyrrhiza Oberm. - Transvaal
 Cyanotis paludosa Brenan - Zaïre, Kenya, Uganda, Tanzania
 Cyanotis papilionacea (Burm.f.) Schult. & Schult.f. - southern India
 Cyanotis pedunculata Merr. - Leyte Island in Philippines
 Cyanotis pilosa Schult. & Schult.f. - southern India, Sri Lanka
 Cyanotis polyrrhiza Hochst. ex Hassk. - Ethiopia
 Cyanotis racemosa B.Heyne ex Hassk. - southern India, Sri Lanka
 Cyanotis repens Faden & D.M.Cameron - Zaïre, Kenya, Rwanda, Tanzania, Gabon
 Cyanotis reutiana Beauverd - southern India
 Cyanotis robusta Oberm. - Transvaal, Namibia
 Cyanotis scaberula Hutch. - Guinea
 Cyanotis somaliensis C.B.Clarke - Somalia
 Cyanotis speciosa (L. f.) Hassk.  - central + southern Africa, Madagascar
 Cyanotis thwaitesii Hassk. - India, Sri Lanka, Myanmar
 Cyanotis tuberosa (Roxb.) Schult. & Schult.f.  - western India
 Cyanotis vaga (Lour.) Schult. & Schult.f. - tropical Africa, Yemen, Himalayas, southern China, Indochina, Java
 Cyanotis vaginata Wight - southern India
 Cyanotis villosa (Spreng.) Schult. & Schult.f. - southern India, Sri Lanka

Gallery

References

External links

 
Commelinales genera
Taxa named by David Don